Saron Läänmäe (born 9 May 1996) is an Estonian former footballer, who has played as a defender for Naiste Meistriliiga club Flora Tallinn and the Estonia women's national football team.

In 2015 Läänmäe enrolled at the University of Central Lancashire and paused her elite football career while rehabilitating an ankle injury. She later played college soccer for the University team. On her graduation she rejoined Flora Tallinn. She retired from football after the 2020 season when her enjoyment of the sport waned.

References

External links

1996 births
Living people
Estonian women's footballers
Estonia women's international footballers
Women's association football defenders
FC Flora (women) players
Expatriate women's footballers in England
Alumni of the University of Central Lancashire
Estonian expatriates in England